Dasoul, sometimes stylized as DaSoul (born 6 February 1990), is a Spanish singer. In 2012, he was signed up by Roster Music. He has collaborated with Henry Mendez.
After releasing several singles, at the end of 2014, he launched "Él No Te Da". The track remained in the Top 10 for more than two months of the Spanish Official Singles Sales Chart. The singles have a platinum disc.

Biography 
In 2012, Dasoul was signed by Roster Music.

His tracks have been included in Gran Hermano.

In 2015, he was nominated to Best Spanish New Act in Los Premios 40 Principales, losing out to Álvaro Soler.

Discography

Albums

Singles

Others
 "De lao a lao" (2013)
 "De lao a lao (No pierdes el break)" (with Fito Blanko & Maffio, 2014)
 "Vámonos pa la Calle" (with Maffio, 2014)
 "Déjalo" (2014)
 "Prometo Amarte" (2015)

Collaborations 
 "Todos los Latinos" (with Henry Mendez, Cristian Deluxe and Charly Rodríguez, 2013)
 "Amarte más" (with Henry Mendez, 2014)
 "Dale" (with Kiko Rivera, 2015) 
 "Para que llorar" (with Keymass y Bonche, 2015)
 Formentera (with Ricky Santoro, 2015)
 Pa que lo bailen en la disco (with Álvaro Guerra, 2015)
 Eres mía (con XRIZ, 2016)
 Yo Soy Su Marido (with Martín Sangar,2016)
 Mamasita (with Katy Perry, 2017)
 Quién se va primero (with XRIZ y Danny Romero, 2017)
 A ti te cuido yo (Lento/Veloz) (with Tiziano Ferro)

References 

 Actuación en GH VIP (Telecinco) 
 Entrevista en Morning Glory (Mediaset)

External links
Official website

1990 births
Musicians from the Canary Islands
Living people
21st-century Spanish singers
21st-century Spanish male singers